KAUG (89.9 FM) was a radio station licensed to serve Anchorage, Alaska. The station was last owned by the Anchorage School District. It aired a variety format.

The station was assigned the KAUG call letters by the Federal Communications Commission (FCC) on August 7, 2007. The FCC cancelled the station's license and deleted its call sign on February 2, 2022 for failure to file an application for license renewal.

References

External links
Anchorage School District

2007 establishments in Alaska
2022 disestablishments in Alaska
Anchorage School District
AUG
Radio stations established in 2007
Radio stations disestablished in 2022
AUG
Defunct radio stations in the United States
AUG